Recursion is the process of repeating items in a self-similar way.

Recursion may also refer to
 Mathematical induction, a method of proof also called "proof by recursion"
 Recursion (computer science), a method where the solution to a problem depends on solutions to smaller instances of the same problem
 Recurrence relation, a recursive formula for a sequence of numbers 
 Recursion, a 2004 science fiction novel by Tony Ballantyne
 Recursion, a 2019 science fiction novel by Blake Crouch
 Recursive science fiction, science fiction about science fiction

See also 
 Recursive function (disambiguation)